The 2009–10 AHL season was the 74th season of the American Hockey League. Twenty-nine teams played 80 regular-season games each from October 2 to April 11. This season featured the addition of one new team, the relocation of two others, and the involuntary suspension of another.

League business

European pre-season openers
On June 11, 2009, both the Hamilton Bulldogs and the Toronto Marlies were invited to participate in a four-team preseason tournament in Edinburgh, Scotland, to celebrate Scotland's contribution to the game of ice hockey.

The Edinburgh Capitals, Scotland's only Elite Ice Hockey team, hosted the tournament from September 24–27. The Bulldogs and Marlies played the Capitals and the Belfast Giants in order to win the Gardiner Cup. Hamilton defeated Toronto in the final.

Playoff format
The top four teams from each division played for the Calder Cup. The league's rules included one exception: if the fifth-place team in the Atlantic Division finishes better than the fourth-place team in the East Division, they assume the fourth playoff spot in the East Division. The Atlantic Division's Bridgeport Sound Tigers qualified for the playoffs under this provision.

Team and NHL affiliation changes

Team changes
On April 28, 2009, it was announced that two teams would be relocated for the 2009–10 season and one expansion team would join: 
Quad City Flames would move to Abbotsford, BC due to poor ticket sales. They became the Abbotsford Heat.
Philadelphia Phantoms would relocate to Glens Falls, NY due to the Wachovia Spectrum being demolished fall of 2009. They became the Adirondack Phantoms.
Texas Stars joined the league with a limited membership and will be operated by the Dallas Stars. The limited membership is conditioned on the completed purchase of an existing AHL franchise within one year.
Iowa Chops involuntarily suspended operations on July 7, 2009, by the AHL Board of Governors for the 2009-10 season for being "unable to remedy certain violations of the provisions of the league's Constitution and By-Laws" .

Affiliation changes

Standings 

  indicates team has clinched division and a playoff spot
  indicates team has clinched a playoff spot

  indicates team has been eliminated from playoff contention

Eastern Conference

Western Conference

Statistical leaders

Leading skaters 

The following players led the league in points at the conclusion of the regular season.

GP = Games played; G = Goals; A = Assists; Pts = Points; +/– = Plus-minus; PIM = Penalty minutes

 = No longer with listed team

Leading goaltenders 

The following goaltenders with a minimum 1560 minutes played led the league in goals against average at the end of the regular season.

GP = Games played; TOI = Time on ice (in minutes); SA = Shots against; GA = Goals against; SO = Shutouts; GAA = Goals against average; SV% = Save percentage; W = Wins; L = Losses; OT = Overtime/shootout loss

Calder Cup playoffs

Bracket

AHL awards

Milestones

See also
List of AHL seasons
2009 in ice hockey
 2010 in ice hockey

References

AHL official site

 
2009-10
2
2